The term Barcoding may refer to:

 Barcode
 DNA barcoding